MALÉRT (Magyar Légiforgalmi R.T.) was a Hungarian airline, founded on November 19, 1922. The airline merged with Aeroflot in 1944-46 into Maszovlet (Magyar-Szovjet Légiforgalmi Társaság) a forerunner of MALÉV Hungarian Airlines.

By 1929, the airline flew regular flights connecting Budapest with Belgrade and Vienna.

The main fleet before 1939 were eight triple-engined German-built Junkers Ju52/3m aircraft HA-JUA to HA-JUG, one airplane HA-DUR for the government, delivered between 1933–39. Five somewhat comparable triple-engined Italian-built Savoia Marchetti S.M.75 aircraft HA-SMA to HA-SME, delivered in 1938–39. And also 3 German-built Focke-Wulf Fw 58 airplanes, with the codes HA-FOA to HA-FOD.

Mainstream services operated in 1938-9 were daily Budapest-Kraków-Warsaw, daily Budapest-Prague and daily Budapest-Vienna.

References

Defunct airlines of Hungary
Airlines established in 1922
Airlines disestablished in 1944
1922 establishments in Hungary
1944 disestablishments in Hungary